Kosuvaripalle is a village in the Annamaya district of the Indian state of Andhra Pradesh. It is located in the Thamballapalle mandal.

Administration 

Kosuvaripalle is administered by a gram panchayat.

Demographics 

As of 2011 Census of India, the village had a population of 6271. The total population village, 3080 males, 3191 females. Total house holders in the village are 1471. The average literacy rate stands at 64%.

Economy 

The economy is based on agriculture and main products include tomato, mango, groundnut, tamarind and silk. Tomatoes and other agriculture products from here are supplied to the Madanapalle Market. Kosuvari Palle is also famous for custard apple, which come from surrounding hills and agricultural fields.

Education 

ZPH School is the oldest educational institute, it was founded in earlier 60's. There are many MPP Schools in Kosuvaripalle surrounding villages.

References

External links

Villages in Chittoor district
Mandal headquarters in Chittoor district